The Wayne Manifesto is an Australian children's television series that aired on the ABC. Based on the children's books by David McRobbie, it is centred on the life of 12-year-old Wayne Wilson, showing the world both as the way he would like it and the way it really is. Filmed in Brisbane, Australia, it aired weekdays at 5pm on the ABC in 1997 and re-runs at 4.30pm in 1999. It has also aired on the BBC in the UK and was broadcast from 1998 to 2005.

Cast
 Jeffrey Walker as Wayne Wilson
 Simon James as Keven Mary
 Remi Broadway as Rupert
 Brooke Harman as Rosie
 Cassandra Magrath as Charlene
 Jah'shua McAvoy as Squocka
 Korey Fernando as James
 Tracey-Louise Smith as Violet
 Ingrid Mason as Mrs. Pringle
 Rainee Skinner as Wayne's Mum
 Nick Waters as Dad

Episodes
 A Wayne in a Manger
 The Alien
 This Guy Dellafield
 A Slave to Fashion
 Pizza
 Rites and Wrongs
 The Wayne Manifesto
 There's Good in Everybody
 Harris Weed
 You Can't Take Him Anywhere
 Junk
 Work Experience
 Wise Words
 Now You See It, Now You Still See It
 Fancy Dress
 Wheels Within Wheels
 Special Operations
 Elementary, My Dear Squocka
 Soap
 Amy Pastrami Day
 Witch Wayne
 A Wayne's Gotta Do...
 The Harder They Fall
 Where's Wilson
 Dad's Ad
 Wayne in the Wings

Merchandise

Village Roadshow released the following VHS tapes in 1997 containing two episodes each:

The Alien
This Guy Dellafield

Awards
 It won 1996 AFI Award for Best Children's Television Drama.
An ATOM (Australian Teachers of Media) Award for Best Children's Drama series.
David McRobbie won an AWGIE (Australian Writer's Guild) Award for 3 episodes.

References

External links
 
 
The Wayne Manifesto at the National Film and Sound Archive

Australian children's television series
Australian Broadcasting Corporation original programming
Australian television shows based on children's books
Television series by Endemol Australia
Television shows set in Brisbane
1997 Australian television series debuts
1997 Australian television series endings
BBC children's television shows